Daniel Zettel (born 1984) is a Brazilian actor. He is best known for starring in the 2002 film City of God as Tiago, as well as in the films Blindness (2008) and Trash (2014). He also had roles in TV shows such as Mulheres Apaixonadas.

References

Brazilian film actors
Living people
Date of birth missing (living people)
1984 births